Puszcza Niepołomice is a professional Polish football club located in Niepołomice, Poland. It currently plays in the second tier. The team's colors are yellow, white and green.

Current squad

References

External links
 
 Puszcza Niepołomice (90minut.pl) 

Association football clubs established in 1923
Football clubs in Lesser Poland Voivodeship
Wieliczka County
1923 establishments in Poland